Ithaca College Television (ICTV) is Ithaca College's student television channel.  Founded in 1958 as the first student-run cable television station, ICTV provides original, student-produced programming to approximately 26,000 households in Tompkins County, New York through Spectrum Cable.  Additionally, ICTV offers a livestream of its programming on its website, ICTV.org, along with on-demand episodes from past and present shows.

ICTV cablecasts on Spectrum cable, though it previously was through Time Warner. The channel programs twelve-week seasons during the fall and spring semesters, Sundays through Thursdays from 6:30pm-11pm. When ICTV is not broadcasting original content, a live view of Cayuga Lake is transmitted and  VIC Radio is played.

Ithaca College Television was created to provide community-oriented public affairs and entertainment programming to the Ithaca-area cable audience. It also is the only source of local news for Tompkins County, since the closest news station is Syracuse. Since all programming on ICTV is almost all student-initiated, so any semester's productions depend upon the interests of the active participants. Currently, ICTV has five branches of programming - News, Sports, Entertainment, Game Shows, Original Series, and Podcasts.  Re-introduced to ICTV in Spring 2014, Special Projects focuses on bringing live and non-traditional programming to ICTV. Projects include event coverage, student films, and extended sports, news packages, and more. Any show that goes on ICTV is being completely produced and run by students. ICTV Shorts can now be found under Original Series. Though it varies from semester to semester, each ICTV semester features between 20 and 26 shows, and over 400 participants.

Current Programming

ICTV currently has the following television programs in production:

 After Hours
A late night talk show. Topics include pop culture, current events, guest interviews and performer showcases. 
 Big Red Faceoff
Sports show covering Cornell College's men's and women's ice hockey teams, including highlights, analysis and interviews. 
 Bombers Live
Live coverage and panel analysis of Ithaca College home game sports events, including football and basketball.
 Entertainment Exclusive
A show presenting you with the latest in all things entertainment
 Fake Out
Competitive game show which challenges contestants to guess which stories are true and which are false in order to claim the prize.
 Game Over
Primarily a news show, centered around video game, movie, and comic reviews, as well as all things geek culture. It is the longest running show on ICTV.
 Hold That Thought
Live sports debate show. Panelists discuss recent collegiate and professional sports, then viewers vote on who won and will return for the next episode. 
 Newswatch
News program covering local news for Ithaca and all of Tomkins County. Newswatch is the only local news program in the area. 
 Sketch Me If You Can
Contestant teams in this game show must guess what is being drawn to compete for points and win the game. 
 So You Think You Know Sports
Teams test their sports knowledge
 Next Player Up
 The Gridiron Report
 Sports Final
Local sports coverage, reporting stories on Cornell and Ithaca College sports as well as Tomkins County high school sports. 
 The Director's Chair
Behind-the-scenes of Ithaca College student filmmaking. Includes student film news, cast and crew interviews and more. 
 The Screening Room
Movie review show. Each week two critique and give their grades to recently released Hollywood films, as well as give their DVD recommendations. 
 The Week That Was
Satirizing and educating on current events and politics. 
 Good Day Ithaca
Staying up to date with the latest events in Ithaca in a talk show style
 Roommate Rumble

Past Programming

ICTV's archives hold fifty plus years of original ICTV programs, some of which can be found on ICTV's website.  Listed below are some notable programs from ICTV's past:

"Ivy"

Based on the hit MTV shows Laguna Beach and The Hills, IVY was the most recent show to gain significant attention at ICTV. The new comedy was the first ICTV show to take place entirely at Cornell University. Praised for its unique visual design and effective parody of reality TV-style shows, IVY became a major hit not only at Ithaca College and Cornell University, but throughout the entire Ivy League as well. After the first season premiered, Ivy was recognized on several blogs, and The Cornell Daily Sun wrote an article about the show.

"The Race"

One show that generated excitement outside of the Ithaca community was The Race, a reality series inspired by the hit CBS show, The Amazing Race. The Race won several awards and was recognized on various reality TV websites and blogs. It aired for two seasons in 2007.

Awards

Throughout its history, ICTV has won many awards.  Some of the station's most notable wins are:

2012
BEA Festival of Media Arts: Student Video Awards'' Las Vegas, NV – April 2012
Third Place, Studio (Multi-Camera or Live-to-Tape) Pop Quiz, Tournament of Champions
Society of Professional Journalists Mark of Excellence, 2012
Third Place, Region 1 Newswatch 16

2011
The Collegiate Broadcasters Inc. 2011 National Student Production Awards, Orlando, FL – October 2011
Finalist, Best Comedy "To A Pulp" produced by Joe Killeen and Nate Breton
Finalist, Best Promo "ICTV–It’s Everywhere" produced by Nick Righi
Finalist, Best PSA "Take Back the Tap" produced by Nick Righi and Erik Keto
Finalist, Best Sportscast "Hold That Thought" produced by Alex Haubenstock and Jason Rickel
Finalist, Best Documentary/Public Affairs "Invading the Everglades" produced by Nick Righi
Society of Professional Journalists Mark of Excellence Providence, RI – March 2011
Winner, Region 1 Newswatch 16

2010
Winner, Best Regularly Scheduled Local News Program Newswatch 16
Winner, Best News Story Newswatch 16: "Best Shooting in Ithaca"
Society of Professional Journalists Mark of Excellence Third Place, Region 1 Newswatch 16

2009
The Collegiate Broadcasters Inc. 2009 National Student Production Awards
Winner, Best Sportscast: "Sports Final" produced by Jodi Eisenberg, Dana Matson, Kevin Cartini, and Matt McLaughlin. Sports director: Tom Wrede
Winner, Best Newscast: "Newswatch 16″ produced by Becky Goodling. News Director: Bryan Mercer.
Finalist, Best Student Media Web Site: ICTV.org
Finalist, Best General Entertainment Program: "Entertainment 16″ Produced by Andrea Teplitsky, Mariel Rubin, and Faryn Shiro
Finalist, Best Promo: ICTV.org, produced by Matt Baldovsky
Finalist, Best Live Sports Production (two finalists): "Bombers Football vs. Frostburg State" produced by Allison Gainza and Ryan Boyce; "Bombers Women’s Basketball vs. Stevens" produced by Allison Gainza and Jodi Eisenberg
Finalist, Best Special Broadcast: "ICTV 50th Anniversary" produced by Stu Kenny
Education Campus Television Administrators (AHECTA) 2009
Grand Prize, "Busking the Big Apple" produced by Chris Cucci, Chris Burt, and Sarah Justine Woodhouse

New York State Associated Press Broadcasters Association Awards – College Television Competition
First Place, "Newswatch 16″ produced by Becky Goodling. News Director: Brian Mercer

References

External links
 ICTV website

Student television stations in the United States
Ithaca College